Hampshire County Cricket Club was formed in 1863, and first appeared in the County Championship in 1895 and played their first List A match in 1963.  They played their first Twenty20 match in the 2003 Twenty20 Cup against Sussex.  The players in this list have all played at least one Twenty20 match for Hampshire.  Hampshire cricketers who have not represented the county in Twenty20 cricket are excluded from the list.

Players are listed in order of appearance, where players made their debut in the same match, they are ordered by batting order.  Players in bold have played only Twenty20 cricket for the Hampshire.

Key

List of players

See also
 Hampshire County Cricket Club
 List of Hampshire County Cricket Club first-class players
 List of Hampshire County Cricket Club List A players
 List of international cricketers from Hampshire

References

External links 
 Twenty20 matches played by Hampshire at CricketArchive

Hampshire County Cricket Club

T20
Cricketers
Hampshire